Valad (also Romanized as Vald) is a village in Gurab Zarmikh Rural District, Mirza Kuchek Janghli District, Sowme'eh Sara County, Gilan Province, Iran. In 2006, its population was 1,108, in 310 families.

References 

Populated places in Sowme'eh Sara County